Anjuman Shaheen, is a Pakistani film actress and singer. She was one of the most successful Punjabi film heroines of Pakistan during the 1970s, 1980s and 1990s. She was born in Bahawalpur. Anjuman's parents were from Ahmadpur East, settled in Multan where Anjuman was brought up. She later moved to Lahore.

Career 
Her career spanned almost 20 years and she appeared in more than 300 films. She first appeared in the Urdu film, Soorath (1973) co-starring with Waseem Abbas, Afshan, Taj Niazi. Her last appearance was in Peengan (2000). Soorath was not a success. Her first major hit was Waadey Ki Zanjeer (1979). She had major roles in Sher Khan and Chan Varyam (1981) and played a supporting role in film Sala Sahib (1981). All three were diamond jubilee hit films and were released the same day, a unique record, which she shared with her co-star Sultan Rahi, her playback voice Madam Noor Jehan, and musician Wajahat Attre.

She appeared with every hero of her era, but her pairing with Sultan Rahi ruled the Punjabi cinema for more than a decade. She also appeared with Waheed Murad, Ali Ejaz, Javed Sheikh, Ghulam Mohiuddin, Izhar Qazi and Nadeem. Her initial films were in Urdu but the bulk of her career was based on acting in Punjabi films. Her roles ranged from a traditional innocent village girl to modern sexy bombshell, romantic to action-packed films. Anjuman was a darling of the working classes. She had the figure of a traditional Punjabi Mutyaar much admired in Punjab, Pakistan. Her fans also admired her dancing, especially her thumkas (a dance form which consists of pelvic thrusting).

In the 1980s, after the box-office success of Chan Varyam (1981 film), Sultan Rahi, Mustafa Qureshi, Anjuman and the playback singing of Madam Noor Jehan dominated the Punjabi film industry to such an extent that a film was not considered a viable project unless they were present in it. Film after film was launched with all the four stars, with different names, but merely repeating their roles from the previous efforts. Nonetheless, the public lapped it up and all of them became icons of an era.

Anjuman as an action heroine 
In Punjabi films, Sultan Rahi gained reputation as an action hero but in many films Anjuman herself played an action heroine where she would fight with the villains. Some of her action films are Mela (1986), Hunter Wali (1988), Dulari (1987), Qatil Haseena (1989), Daku Haseena, Kali Charan, Sultana, Nangi Talwar, etc.

She was seen in action films, riding horses, driving motor bikes and doing stunts which gave a new dimension to female roles in Lollywood movies, which previously only promoted the image of a shy and innocent girl. Plots of Anjuman's action films were mainly revenge based. She played a don in Insaniyat ke dushman. Anjuman can be considered as the first established action heroine of the Pakistan film industry. Her viewers not only liked her acting and dances but also her action skills.

Marriage 
Anjuman married income tax commissioner, Mobin Malik, gave birth to two sons and one daughter. Zeeshan, Adnan and Iman, quit films, and lived in the United Kingdom with her family. However, Mobin Malik, Anjuman's husband was murdered on Eid day in 2013 while he was in Lahore visiting relatives.

Anjuman got married for the second time on 17 June 2019 with Waseem Lucky Ali. The ceremony was attended by only close family and friends.

Comeback in films 
Anjuman returned to acting in 1999 in the title role in the film Chaudrani (1999 film). The adoring masses welcomed their beloved 'Queen' home and lifted Chaudhrani to a considerable success upon its release but soon the golden touch began to fade. Anjuman, however, perceived Chaudhrani'''s success as vindication of everything she had planned. She refused any further character roles, opting only for solo heroine projects and required a lofty salary of Rs. 300,000. She felt that she was in a position to be calling all the shots, but in any film industry you are only as good as your last hit and she was soon to taste the price of stardom. Her next release was Jag Mahi, opposite Ghulam Mohiuddin, in 2000 met with a tepid response . Anjuman's next release was a litmus test of sorts. The film Peengan (2000) opposite Saud was met with derision due to the age gap between her and the film's hero.

She was abruptly dropped from the film Badmaash, for which she had already canned two songs and numerous scenes, and replaced by upcoming starlet Noor. The film producer felt they would be better off cutting Anjuman, and their costs, rather than going ahead with Anjuman as the leading lady.

Further news arrived that Anjuman's scenes in the film Badmaash tey Qanoon had also been dropped and edited out of the film, and that she had been replaced by Nargis. This was the final straw for Anjuman, the humiliation proving too much to take. She announced her immediate retirement, that she was just hanging around to complete her on hand assignments, and that she would shortly be leaving Pakistan altogether for a life of anonymity in the UK where her former husband Mobin Malik owned a flat in Knightsbridge, London. Her final two movies were Jatti da vair in 2000 and Ik dhee punjab di'' (Daughter of Punjab).

Filmography

Awards and recognition

See also 
 List of Pakistani actresses
 Gori

References

External links
 Filmography of actress Anjuman on Pakistan Movie Database website
 
 Filmography of Anjuman on Complete Index To World Film (CITWF) website

1955 births
Pakistani film actresses
Pakistani stunt performers
Living people
20th-century Pakistani actresses
Punjabi-language singers
21st-century Pakistani actresses
Actresses in Sindhi cinema
Actresses in Punjabi cinema
Recipients of the Pride of Performance
Actresses in Urdu cinema
20th-century Pakistani women singers
Nigar Award winners
Pakistani women singers
Actresses in Pashto cinema
Singers from Lahore
Lux Style Award winners
21st-century Pakistani women singers
Urdu-language singers